Khurafat: Perjanjian Syaitan (or simply Khurafat) is a 2011 Malaysian Malay-language supernatural horror film directed by Syamsul Yusof starring Syamsul himself and Liyana Jasmay as a lead role. The film was released on January 13, 2011, and it was his first horror film.  The film also produced a TV series, the Khurafat The Series which was aired on 12 July 2011 at Astro Ria.

Synopsis
Tells the forbidden covenant and one of the forms of misappropriation in the Islamic aqidah between humans and demons, something which is deeply prohibited in our holy religion of peace. But man, regardless of the outcome of turning away from Allah, backed by greedy vengeance, was finally drifting with the devil's whisper.

The story begins with Johan, a young man working as a Hospital Assistant. He is married to Aishah. The couple started the marriage alive and happy but unexpectedly the trauma hit the street. They are often disturbed by strange institutions. Various attempts have been made but the disturbance continues. This is terrifying them especially Johan. The presence of an old mystery woman coupled with the emergence of Johan's former girlfriend named Anna who was weird and frightening to add another episode of this couple's trauma.

Anna always interrupts Johan even when Johan is with Aishah. This led to Johan increasingly running. Shortly afterwards, Anna was found dead in suicide. Anna's death was the culmination of strange things that happened in Johan's life. Anna's shadow began to disturb Johan or Aishah. Johan's life is getting depressed. After being caught in a variety of strange events then finally revealed all the mysteries. Johan finally agreed with his past mistakes ... the act of Khurafat practiced now claiming his right and Johan had to pay him for a very high price.

Cast
 Syamsul Yusof as Johan
 Liyana Jasmay as Aishah 
 Sabrina Ali as Anna
 Along Eyzendy as Rosman
 Fauziah Nawi as ibu Johan & Ila.
 Huda Ali as Ila
 Mariani Ismail as Mak Cik Rosnah
 Latiff Borgiba as Bomoh
 Salina Saibi as Zura
 A. Galak as Pak Aziz
 Ruzaidi Abdul Rahman as Imam Kahar
 Shah Iskandar as Shah
 Iffa Marisha sebagai Iffa
 Izzue Islam as Night Club Visitors

Reception
In the four days of the show, the movie Khurafat earned a collection of RM2.5 million, as well as being placed at the top of Malaysian cinema collection charts at the weekend of 13–16 January 2011. The film is still outperforming the national cinema chart in the second week (20-26 January 2011).

References

External links 
 

Malaysian horror films
Films directed by Syamsul Yusof
Films produced by Yusof Haslam
Films with screenplays by Syamsul Yusof
Skop Productions films